The 1991 NCAA Women's Gymnastics championship involved 12 schools competing for the national championship of women's NCAA Division I gymnastics.  It was the tenth NCAA gymnastics national championship and the defending NCAA Team Champion for 1990 was Utah.  The Competition took place in Tuscaloosa, Alabama hosted by the University of Alabama in Coleman Coliseum. The 1991 Championship was won by host, Alabama.

Team Results

External links
  Gym Results

NCAA Women's Gymnastics championship
NCAA Women's Gymnastics Championship